Leopoldo Máximo Falicov (June 24, 1933 – January 24, 1995) was an Argentine theoretical physicist, specializing in the theory of condensed matter physics.

Life
Falicov was born in Buenos Aires with both parents of Eastern European Jewish origin. His father, Isaías Félix Falicov, was Argentine and his mother, Dora Samoilovich, emigrated to Argentina as a child.

Falicov attended the Colegio Nacional de Buenos Aires and then attended the School of Engineering and Natural Sciences at the University of Buenos Aires, where he got his undergraduate degree in chemistry in 1957. In 1958, he received his undergraduate degree in physics from the then-recently created Institute of Physics, later known as the Balseiro Institute. He completed a Ph.D. in Physics at Cambridge University in England in 1959 under Professor Volker Heine. He then became a professor at the University of Chicago.

In 1959 he married Marta Puebla whom made his famous Magnesium Fermi Surface in his post doctoral thesis.

In 1969, he moved to Berkeley to work at University of California, Berkeley, heading the department from 1981 to 1983.

Falicov was a member of the National Academy of Sciences, the Royal Danish Academy of Sciences and Letters and the Academia Nacional de Ciencias Exactas, Fisicas y Naturales. He was a fellow of the American Physical Society, the  Institute of Physics and the Third World Academy of Sciences.

Honours 
A library, Biblioteca Leo Falicov, at the Balseiro Institute is named after him.

External links
Falicov's monster (Drawing by Marta Puebla)
National Academy of Sciences Biographical Memoir

References 

1933 births
1995 deaths
20th-century Argentine physicists
Argentine people of Jewish descent
Members of the United States National Academy of Sciences
University of Chicago faculty
University of California, Berkeley College of Letters and Science faculty